The Smith H. Barlow House is a historic house located at Harwood Drive in Lacona, Oswego County, New York.

Description and history 
It was built about 1898, and is a -story, frame Queen Anne–style structure consisting of a rectangular main block, -story east wing, and one-story gabled rear wing. It features a -story square tower and one-story entry porch. Also on the property is a contemporary carriage house.

It was listed on the National Register of Historic Places on November 15, 1988.

References

Houses on the National Register of Historic Places in New York (state)
Queen Anne architecture in New York (state)
Houses completed in 1898
Houses in Oswego County, New York
National Register of Historic Places in Oswego County, New York